Baio may refer to:

 Baio, A Coruña, a village near Zas, Spain
 Baio (surname)

See also
 Bayo (disambiguation)
 Bajo
 Baìo